In 2012 BK Häcken finished second in the Allsvenskan championship and were eliminated from the Svenska Cupen at the group stage.

2012 season squad
Statistics prior to season start only

Transfers

In

Out

Appearances and goals 
As of 25 May 2012

|}

Matches

Pre-season/friendlies

Allsvenskan

Svenska cupen

Competitions

Allsvenskan

Standings

Results summary

Results by round

Season statistics

Superettan 

= Number of bookings
8px= Number of sending offs after a second yellow card
= Number of sending offs by a direct red card

References
Footnotes

References

External links
 BK Häcken homepage
 SvFF homepage

BK Häcken seasons
Hacken